Remedios District is a district (distrito) of Chiriquí Province in Panama. The population according to the 2000 census was 3,489. The district covers a total area of 168 km2. The capital lies at the city of Remedios.

History
Remedios District is one of the divisions that makes up the Province of Chiriqui, located in the Republic of Panama.

Chiriqui was first discovered in 1519 by Gaspar de Espinosa.

Considered the oldest populations of Chiriqui, was founded in 1589,(according to historians recognized Alberto Osorio, Ernesto Castillero and Ruben D. Carles) by Captain Martin Gutierrez, receiving the name of "Our Lady of Remedios".
The location became an important commercial center for three reason:
1. Its proximity to the sea
2. For having the resources needed to manufacture timber vessels.
3. Joins Santiago from Veraguas and Alanje (Previously known as Chiriqui).

Remedios was the focus of evangelism of the Guaymi Indians of the area.

See also
Central America
Isthmus of Panama
Indigenous peoples of the Americas
Projectile point
Barriles
Conquistador
Spanish Empire
Virgin of Los Remedios
Panama

Administrative divisions
Remedios District is divided administratively into the following corregimientos:

Nuestra Señora de los Remedios (capital)
El Nancito
El Porvenir
El Puerto
Santa Lucía

References

Districts of Panama
Chiriquí Province